The Catholic Church in Tanzania is part of the worldwide Catholic Church, under the spiritual leadership of the Pope in Rome.

There are more than 12 million Catholics in the country, about a quarter of the total population.

Ecclesial structure 
There are 34 dioceses, including 7 archdioceses:

The Ecclesiastical Province of Arusha:
Arusha
 Mbulu
 Moshi
 Same
The Ecclesiastical Province of Dar-es-Salaam:
Dar-es-Salaam
 Ifakara
 Mahenge
 Morogoro
 Tanga
 Zanzibar
The Ecclesiastical Province of Dodoma:
 Dodoma
Kondoa
Singida
The Ecclesiastical Province of Mbeya:
 Mbeya
 Iringa
 Sumbawanga
The Ecclesiastical Province of Mwanza: 
Mwanza
 Bukoba
 Bunda
 Geita
 Kayanga
 Musoma
 Rulenge-Ngara
 Shinyanga
The Ecclesiastical Province of Songea:
Songea
 Lindi
 Mbinga
 Mtwara
 Njombe
 Tunduru–Masasi
The Ecclesiastical Province of Tabora:
Tabora
 Kahama
 Kigoma
 Mpanda

References

External links 
 
 Catholic Church in Tanzania: Facts and Figures, Netzwerk Africa, viewed on 5 January 2009
 Website of Tanzanian Episcopal Conference T.E.C. (English)

 
Tanzania
Tanzania